Mengkuang Dam (Malay: Empangan Mengkuang, Tasik Mengkuang) is a dam in Central Seberang Perai District, Penang, Malaysia. It is the only dam situated in Seberang Perai (Penang Mainland) and the second dam built in Penang after Ayer Itam dam. It was officially opened by the former governor, Dr. Tun Awang bin Hassan in 1985. Mengkuang Dam will be closed to the public from August 1, 2011, until July 31, 2016, for enlargement and renovation. A new intake and spillway will also be added.

Recreation
The park in the dam area is a popular place for recreation. Mengkuang Dam is also one of the venues for the annual Penang International Dragon Boat Festival. The festival is a fiesta of colour and noise, in which traditionally-built boats race through the waters of this dam, the boats are cheered on by enthusiastic spectators. The race begins with a slow beating of the drums by the helmsmen. The beat increases steadily, going faster and faster, and then rising to a crescendo as the boats cross the finish line. The ornate and painted 'dragons' on the boats' prows add to the gaiety of the festival.

See also
 Penang
 Seberang Perai
 Dams in Malaysia

References

Buildings and structures in Penang
Central Seberang Perai District
Dams completed in 1985
Dams in Malaysia